The Sauk Rapids Bridge was a steel spandrel braced arch bridge that spanned the Mississippi River between the cities of St. Cloud and Sauk Rapids in the U.S. state of Minnesota. It was built in 1942 and was designed by the Minnesota Department of Transportation. The bridge consisted of three spans supported by two piers. The river is still rough and fast-flowing at this location.

With the opening of the new Sauk Rapids Regional Bridge, located a short distance upstream, on October 23, 2007, the Sauk Rapids Bridge had been closed to all traffic.

After the collapse of the I-35W Mississippi River bridge in Minneapolis on August 1, 2007, Minnesota Governor Tim Pawlenty ordered the Sauk Rapids Bridge and two other bridges in Minnesota to be inspected. The three bridges have a design similar to that of the former I-35W bridge.

The bridge was inspected on August 4 and found to be structurally sound.

As of March 2008, the bridge had been completely dismantled.

See also
Sauk Rapids Regional Bridge
List of crossings of the Upper Mississippi River

References
General references
 
Cited references

Open-spandrel deck arch bridges in the United States
Road bridges in Minnesota
Bridges over the Mississippi River
Bridges completed in 1942
Buildings and structures in Benton County, Minnesota
1942 establishments in Minnesota
Steel bridges in the United States